Clubul Sportiv Cuza Sport Brăila, commonly known as Cuza Sport Brăila or simply Cuza Sport, is a Romanian basketball club based in Brăila, currently participates in the Liga Națională, the top-tier league in Romania.

The club initially played in the second-tier Liga I. However, in 2018 the league was merged with the top-tier Liga Națională.

Current roster

References

External links

2007 establishments in Romania
Basketball teams in Romania
Basketball teams established in 2007